Goin' Straight is a 1917 American silent film featuring Harry Carey and released by Universal Pictures.

Cast
 Harry Carey - Cheyenne Harry
 Priscilla Dean - Mary Carter
 Vester Pegg - Pinnacle Bill (as Vesta Pegg)
 Ted Brooks - Billy Carter
 Ed Jones - Tucson Tom
 Charles Bryden - Wong Lee
 William Steele - Sheriff Dan Bekham (as William Gettinger)

See also
 Harry Carey filmography

References

External links
 

1917 films
1917 short films
American silent short films
American black-and-white films
1917 Western (genre) films
Films directed by Fred Kelsey
Silent American Western (genre) films
1910s American films
1910s English-language films